Megasurcula siogamensis is an extinct species of sea snail, a marine gastropod mollusk in the family Pseudomelatomidae, the turrids and allies.

Distribution
Fossils of this marine species have been found in Middle Miocene strata in Japan.

References

 Nomura, S. "Miocene Mollusca from Siogama, Northeast Honsyu, Japan." Saito Ho-on Kai Museum, Research Bulletin 6 (1935): 193–234.

siogamensis
Gastropods described in 1935